Kwak Jae-yong (born 22 May 1959) is a South Korean film director and screenwriter. He studied physics at Kyung Hee University. He achieved success with his debut film Watercolor Painting in a Rainy Day in 1989, but the failure of his next two movies led to eight years of unemployment before a comeback with the smash-hit film My Sassy Girl in 2001. He is known for his limitless fondness of love stories set in a mix of different genres.

Filmography 
 Watercolor Painting in a Rainy Day (1989) – director & writer
 Autumn Trip (1992) – director & writer
 Watercolor Painting in a Rainy Day 2 (1993) – director & writer
 My Sassy Girl (2001) – director & writer
 The Romantic President (2002) – writer
 The Classic (2003) – director & writer
 Windstruck (2004) – director & writer
 Ark (2004) – story
 My Girl and I (2005) – writer
 Daisy (2006) – writer
 My Mighty Princess (2008) – director & writer
 Cyborg She (2008) – director & writer
 All About Women (2008) – writer/cameo appearance
 Meet Miss Anxiety (2014) – director
 Crying Out in Love (2016) – director & writer
 Time Renegades (2016) – director
 Colours of Wind (2017) – director & writer
 A Year-End Medley (2021) – director

External links 
 
 
 

1959 births
Living people
Kyung Hee University alumni
South Korean film directors